Manay Na Ye Dil (lit: The heart does not accept) is a Pakistani television series that aired on Hum TV and is directed by Babar Jawad. The story is based on the emotional conflicts of four people who feel powerless to control their feelings.

Plot

Zainab, an orphan who has been raised by her aunt, has since childhood been in love with her aunt's son, Sheheryar. Sheheryar ends up in an arranged marriage with Rubab, a selfish woman and the complete opposite of what Sheheryar expects in a wife. When Rubab aborts their child, Sheheryar loses his mind and in deep depression, he becomes involved with Roshni, a prostitute. Sheheryar falls in love with Roshni, but his mother manipulates the situation in such a way that Zainab and Sheheryar get married. Sheheryar, however, does not forget his love and goes in search of Roshni. He finds that Roshni is happily married to another man in Australia with a son. Sheheryar does not know that he is in fact the father of the child. Yet Sheheryar due to his obsession, tries to reconcile his relation with Roshni, and they succeed. The drama ends with both leaving together.

Cast
 Faysal Qureshi as Sheheryar
 Nadia Hussain as Rubab
 Deepti Gupta as Zainab
 Ayesha Khan as Roshni
 Faisal Rehman as Roshni's former husband
 Ayesha Khan as Suriya

Accolades

See also 
 Noorpur Ki Rani
 Aashti
 Mannchalay
 Dil, Diya, Dehleez
 Malaal

References

2007 Pakistani television series debuts
2008 Pakistani television series endings
Pakistani drama television series
Urdu-language television shows
Hum TV original programming